The 2012–13 Argentine Primera B Nacional was the 27th season of second division professional of football in Argentina. A total of 20 teams competed; the champion, runner-up and third-placed team were promoted to Argentine Primera División.

Club information

Standings

Results

Relegation
Clubs with an indirect affiliation with Argentine Football Association are relegated to the Torneo Argentino A, while clubs directly affiliated face relegation to Primera B Metropolitana. Clubs with direct affiliation are all from Greater Buenos Aires, with the exception of Rosario Central, Newell's Old Boys, Central Córdoba and Argentino de Rosario, all from Rosario, and Unión and Colón from Santa Fe. The bottom two teams of this table face relegation regardless of their affiliation status.

Updated to games played in June 2013.

Season statistics

Top scorers

See also
2012–13 in Argentine football

References

External links

Football-Lineups

2012–13 in Argentine football leagues
Primera B Nacional seasons
Arg
Arg